Beau Benzschawel (born September 10, 1995) is an American football guard who is a free agent. He played college football at Wisconsin and signed with the Detroit Lions as an undrafted free agent in 2019. He has also played for the Houston Texans, Washington Football Team, and Jacksonville Jaguars.

High school career 
Benzschawel played tight end and defensive end on the football team at Grafton High School. in addition, he played basketball and baseball.

After originally committing to Syracuse, Benzschawel committed to Wisconsin on October 24, 2013. He had other offers from Iowa State, Wyoming and Bowling Green, among others.

College career 
After redshirting the 2014 season, Benzschawel battled a knee injury before his redshirt freshman season.

During his sophomore season, Benzschawel started every game at offensive guard.

Preceding his junior season, Benzschawel was named a pre-season All American by USA Today. He injured his leg early in the season against Florida Atlantic. After being listed as questionable in the injury report for the following game, he wound up playing against BYU.

After the season, he was named a third-team All-American. He projected as a mid-round pick, with reports highlighting his awareness and long arms. Eventually, he decided not to enter the 2018 NFL Draft after consulting with the NFL Draft Advisory Board.

In August 2018, Benzschawel was named a preseason second-team All-America by CBS Sports.  He was also named a preseason first-team All-American by USA Today and the Associated Press. At the end of the season, Benzschawel was named a Consensus All-American.

Professional career

Detroit Lions
After going undrafted in the 2019 NFL Draft, Benzschawel was signed by the Detroit Lions. On September 5, 2020, Benzchawel was waived by the Lions and signed to the practice squad the next day. He was released from the practice squad on October 22, 2020. Benzschawel was re-signed to the practice squad on October 24. He was released on December 4, 2020.

Houston Texans
On December 9, 2020, Benzschawel was signed to the Houston Texans' practice squad. He was elevated to the active roster on January 2, 2021, for the team's week 17 game against the Tennessee Titans, and reverted to the practice squad after the game. He signed a reserve/future contract on January 4, 2021. He was waived on April 12, 2021.

Washington Football Team
Benzschawel was claimed off waivers by the Washington Football Team on April 13, 2021. He was released on August 31, 2021, but re-signed to the practice squad the following day. On January 10, 2022, Benzschawel signed a reserve/future contract after the 2021 regular season ended. He was released on July 30, 2022.

Jacksonville Jaguars
On August 3, 2022, Benzschawel signed with the Jacksonville Jaguars. He was waived on August 22, 2022.

Tennessee Titans
On December 20, 2022, Benzschawel signed with the practice squad of the Tennessee Titans, but was released three days later.

Personal life 
Benzschawel's brother Luke played tight end for the Badgers. The brothers' father also played at UW as a nose guard. Beau is an avid fisherman.

References

External links 
 Wisconsin Badgers bio

1995 births
Living people
People from Grafton, Wisconsin
Players of American football from Wisconsin
Sportspeople from the Milwaukee metropolitan area
American football offensive guards
Wisconsin Badgers football players
All-American college football players
Detroit Lions players
Houston Texans players
Washington Football Team players
Washington Commanders players
Jacksonville Jaguars players
Tennessee Titans players